Pila Partido is a partido of Buenos Aires Province in Argentina.

Settlements
Casalins
La Florida
La Luz
La Victoria
Pila
Real Audiencia

External links

 
 Provincial site
 Facts about the Partido

1839 establishments in Argentina
Partidos of Buenos Aires Province